Josef Effenberger (18 October 1901 in Prague – 11 November 1983 in Prague) was a Czechoslovak gymnast who competed in the 1928 Summer Olympics.

References

1901 births
1983 deaths
Czechoslovak male artistic gymnasts
Olympic gymnasts of Czechoslovakia
Gymnasts at the 1928 Summer Olympics
Olympic silver medalists for Czechoslovakia
Olympic medalists in gymnastics
Gymnasts from Prague
Medalists at the 1928 Summer Olympics